The 2013 Dayton Flyers football team represented the University of Dayton in the 2013 NCAA Division I FCS football season. They were led by sixth-year head coach Rick Chamberlin and played their home games at Welcome Stadium. They were a member of the Pioneer Football League. They finished the season 7–4, 5–3 in PFL play to finish in a tie for fourth place. The team was awarded White-Allen Most Valuable Player Trophy.

Schedule

References

Dayton
Dayton Flyers football seasons
Dayton Flyers football